Lists of Olympic medalists in swimming are lists of people who have won medals in swimming competitions at the Summer Olympic Games.

General

 List of top Olympic gold medalists in swimming
 List of Olympic records in swimming
 List of Olympic medalists in synchronized swimming
 List of Australian Olympic medallists in swimming

Men 

 List of Olympic medalists in swimming (men)
 List of individual gold medalists in swimming at the Olympics and World Aquatics Championships (men)

Women

 List of Olympic medalists in swimming (women)
 List of individual gold medalists in swimming at the Olympics and World Aquatics Championships (women)